Fernando Ramírez de Haro y Aguirre, 10th Marquess of Villanueva del Duero, GE (born 23 August 1976) is a Spanish aristocrat.

Born at Madrid, he is the eldest son of Fernando Ramírez de Haro, 16th Count of Bornos, Grandee of Spain, and his wife Esperanza Aguirre y Gil de Biedma, the prominent conservative politician and former President of the Community of Madrid.

On 12 April 2000, his paternal grandfather, Ignacio Ramírez de Haro, 15th Count of Bornos, ceded him the marquessate of Villanueva de Duero

Ancestry

Notes

References
Geneall.net
Barrientos, Paloma (18/7/2008): Esperanza Aguirre, matron of honour of his eldest son's wedding in Vanitatis.com
Elenco de Grandezas y Títulos Nobiliarios Españoles, Hidalguía Editions, 2008

|-

1976 births
Living people
Fernando Ramirez
Marquesses of Spain
Counts of Spain
Knights of Malta